Mark Chetcuti (born 4 February 1958) has served as the Chief Justice of Malta since 2020. He had been appointed as a judge in 2010. He is a graduate of the University of Malta.

See also 
Judiciary of Malta

References

External links
Victor Paul Borg, Judicial appointments: ‘Worst constitutional mess since Independence’ Times of Malta, 28 April 2019. Retrieved 23 August 2022. Archived from the original on 28 March 2021.

1958 births
Living people
University of Malta alumni
Chief justices of Malta
21st-century Maltese judges